The Parochial Union of Ordino (UPd'O) was a local political party in Ordino, Andorra.

History
The party first contested national elections in 1997, when it took part in parliamentary elections. The party did not participate in the national-level vote, but put forward candidates in the parish-level elections in alliance with the Liberal Union. The party won both seats in the Ordino provincial circumscription, with Simón Duró Coma and Josep Àngel Mortés Pons being elected to the General Council.

The party has not contested any elections since 1997.

References

Defunct political parties in Andorra
Ordino
Political parties with year of establishment missing
Political parties with year of disestablishment missing